Wendall Williams (born September 18, 1990) is a former American football wide receiver. He played college football at University of the Cumberlands and was signed by the Texans as an undrafted free agent in 2016.  He made many media headlines after he broke the 40-yard dash record, with a time of 4.19 seconds unofficially.

Early life
Williams was born to Claudinne Clark, a house cleaner and hospital sterile processor in Syracuse, New York. He attended Bishop Ludden High School, where he played competitive football and track. In his junior season, he totaled 17 receiving touchdowns, and tallied 28 more as a senior. However, Williams struggled academically, which deterred many colleges from recruiting him. Therefore, he committed to play football at Morrisville State College.

College career
Williams signed with Division III Morrisville State College, where he played football for the Mustangs. After his freshman season, he totaled 30 receptions for 515 yards and 3 touchdowns. However, he left Morrisville State the following year, due to his clashes with the coach. He subsequently enrolled at Onondaga Community College, where he attended for two semesters. He then transferred to Hudson Valley Community College, later dropping out after losing his financial aid package for dropping too many classes. He then worked as a truck driver, and did not continue his athletic career. When Williams was 21, he received a call from family friend Will Dowdell, encouraging Williams to continue his athletic career in college. Motivated, Williams enrolled at Herkimer County Community College, playing basketball and track for the Generals. While at Herkimer, he was a captain of the basketball team, shooting 71 percent from the field, while pursuing an associate degree in business sports management. He accepted an offer to University of the Cumberlands, where he enrolled with two remaining years of athletic eligibility. Williams started at wide receiver during his junior and senior seasons, and competed on the track team, participating in the 100 and 200 meter dash, as well as the long jump. As the University of the Cumberlands' primary receiver in his final season, Williams accounted for 48.3% of the team's receiving yards and touchdowns on 30.5 yards per reception.

Professional career

Houston Texans
Williams was signed by the Texans as an undrafted free agent on May 6, 2016. He was released by the Texans on September 3, 2016 during final roster cuts.

New York Jets
Williams was signed to the Jets' practice squad on September 12, 2016. He was released on September 28, 2016.

Houston Texans (second stint)
Williams was signed to the Texans' practice squad on November 9, 2016. He was promoted to the active roster on December 13, 2016. During his second stint, he played in 2 games recording 4 catches for 75 yards.

On September 2, 2017, Williams was waived by the Texans after breaking his collarbone in a preseason game.

References

External links
 New York Jets bio
 Houston Texans bio

Living people
1990 births
Players of American football from Syracuse, New York
American football wide receivers
Morrisville State College alumni
Morrisville Mustangs football players
Cumberlands Patriots football players
Houston Texans players
New York Jets players
Onondaga Lazers football players
Hudson Valley Vikings football players